Unionville is an unincorporated community in Union Township in Berks County, Pennsylvania, United States. Unionville is located at the intersection of Pennsylvania Route 724 and Unionville Road, south of the Schuylkill River.

References

Unincorporated communities in Berks County, Pennsylvania
Unincorporated communities in Pennsylvania